Thomas Burgess or Tom Burgess may refer to:

Politicians
 Thomas Burgess (died 1623) (c. 1540–1623), alderman of and probably MP for Truro
 Thomas Burgess (died 1626) (c. 1580–1626), his son, Mayor of and MP for Truro
 Thomas Burges (1830–1893), Australian politician
 Thomas M. Burgess (1806–1856), second mayor of Providence, Rhode Island
 Thomas Burgess (settler), founder of Bala, Ontario, Canada, in the mid-1800s
 Tom Burgess (Newfoundland politician) (1933–2006), member of the Newfoundland House of Assembly and leader of the New Labrador Party

Sportsmen
 Tom Burgess (cricketer) (1859–1922), English first-class cricketer
 Bill Burgess (Thomas William Burgess, 1872–1950), Olympic bronze medallist, swam English Channel
 Tom Burgess (baseball) (1927–2008), Canadian baseball player, coach and manager
 Tom Burgess (Canadian football) (born 1964), Canadian Football League quarterback
 Tom Burgess (rugby league) (born 1992), English Rugby League player
 Thomas Burgess (umpire) (1888–1974), New Zealand Test cricket umpire

Other people
 Thomas Burgess (pirate) (1689–1719), pirate active in the Caribbean
 Thomas Burgess (painter floruit 1786), English painter
 Thomas Burgess (painter died 1807) (c. 1784–1807), English painter
 Thomas Burgess (bishop, born 1756) (1756–1837), Bishop of St David's and of Salisbury
 Thomas Burgess (bishop of Clifton) (1791–1854), English Roman Catholic bishop 
 Joseph Tom Burgess (1828–1886), English journalist, writer and artist
 Tom Burgess (winemaker), founder of Burgess Cellars
 Thomas Paul Burgess (born 1959), academic, novelist and musician from Northern Ireland